Melanie McGrath is a Romford-born English non-fiction writer and crime novelist.

Early life
Born in Romford, McGrath's parents moved several times during her childhood; to Basildon in Essex, then to a village in Germany, to Kent, then north to Lancashire, and south again to Buckinghamshire. She studied Philosophy, Politics and Economics at Oxford University.

Career
She won the John Llewellyn Rhys Prize in 1995 for her non fiction book Motel Nirvana, which examined the New Age movement, and detailed McGrath's travels around the American states of Nevada, Colorado, New Mexico and Arizona. Her other non-fiction books have explored the "Information Age" (Hard, Soft and Wet), 20th century British social history, (Hopping and Silvertown) and the non-fiction book, The Long Exile about the High Arctic relocation.

In recent years McGrath has written crime novels, including a trilogy set in the Arctic with Inuit detective Edie Kiglatuk, and the standalone thriller Give Me the Child. As a book reviewer and travel writer, she has written for The Daily Telegraph, The Guardian and The Independent among other publications. McGrath has taught creative writing at the universities of Roehampton University and North Carolina as well as at The Arvon Foundation. McGrath lives in London and on the Kent coast.

Bibliography

Non fiction
1996 - Motel Nirvana Flamingo
1998 - Hard, Soft and Wet Flamingo
2002 - Silvertown, Fourth Estate
2006 - The Long Exile, Fourth Estate
2009 - Hopping, Fourth Estate
2018 - Pie & Mash down the Roman Road, Two Roads

Crime fiction
Edie Kiglatuk trilogy
2011 - White Heat, Mantle (as M.J. McGrath)
2012 - The Boy in the Snow, Mantle (as M.J. McGrath)
2014 - The Bone Seeker, Fourth Estate (as M.J. McGrath)

Standalone
2017 - Give Me the Child, HarperCollins (as Mel McGrath)
2019 - The Guilty Party, HarperCollin (as Mel McGrath)

References

External links
Official site

Living people
English non-fiction writers
English crime fiction writers
English journalists
English travel writers
British women travel writers
English literary critics
Women literary critics
John Llewellyn Rhys Prize winners
Alumni of the University of Oxford
Writers from London
People from Romford
Year of birth missing (living people)